Erdevik is a village located in the municipality of Šid, Srem District, Vojvodina, Serbia. As of 2011 census, it has a population of 2,736 inhabitants.

Demographics

Historical population
 1961: 4,499
 1971: 4,177
 1981: 3,758
 1991: 3,427
 2002: 3,316
 2011: 2,736

Ethnic groups
The ethnic groups in the village as of 2002 census:
 Serbs = 2,007 (60.53%)
 Slovaks = 846 (25.51%)
 Croats = 134 (4.04%)
 Hungarians = 95 (2.87%)
 Yugoslavs = 75 (2.26%)
 Rusyns = 23 (0.69%)
 others.

See also
 List of places in Serbia
 List of cities, towns and villages in Vojvodina
 Church of St. Nicholas, Erdevik

References
 Slobodan Ćurčić, Broj stanovnika Vojvodine, Novi Sad, 1996.

External links 

 Web Site of Erdevik

Populated places in Syrmia